Glenbrook High School may refer to:

 Glenbrook North High School, Northbrook, Cook County, Illinois, which was the only Glenbrook High School until its sister high school was built.
 Glenbrook South High School, Glenview, Cook County, Illinois, GBN's sister high school.